Pepperoni is an American variety of spicy salami made from cured pork and beef seasoned with paprika or other chili pepper.

Prior to cooking, pepperoni is characteristically soft, slightly smoky, and bright red. Thinly sliced pepperoni is one of the most popular pizza toppings in American pizzerias.

Etymology
The term "pepperoni" is a borrowing of peperoni, the plural of peperone, the Italian word for bell pepper. The first use of "pepperoni" to refer to a sausage dates to 1919. In Italian, the word peperoncino refers to hot and spicy chili peppers.

History
Pepperoni, an Italian-American creation, is a cured dry sausage, with similarities to the spicy salamis of southern Italy on which it is based, such as salsiccia or soppressata. The main differences are that pepperoni is less spicy, has a finer grain (akin to spiceless salami from Milan), is usually softer in texture, and is usually produced with the use of an artificial casing.

Production

Pepperoni is made from pork or from a mixture of pork and beef. Turkey meat is also commonly used as a substitute, but the use of poultry in pepperoni must be appropriately labeled in the United States.

Curing with nitrates or nitrites (usually used in modern curing agents to protect against botulism and other forms of microbiological decay) also contributes to pepperoni's reddish color, by reacting with heme in the myoglobin of the proteinaceous components of the meat.

Serving

According to Convenience Store Decisions, Americans consume 251.7 million pounds of pepperoni annually, on 36% of all pizzas produced nationally. Pepperoni has a tendency to curl up from the edges in the heat of a pizza oven. Some pepperoni is produced in thicker slices, so that the edges curl intentionally.

Pepperoni is also used as the filling of the pepperoni roll, a popular regional snack in West Virginia and neighboring areas.

In the Canadian province of Nova Scotia, deep fried pepperoni served on its own (usually with a honey mustard dipping sauce) is common pub food.

See also

 Linguiça
 List of dried foods
 List of sausages

References

Further reading
 Smith, Andrew F. (2007) "Pepperoni". The Oxford Companion to American Food and Drink. p. 447. .
 Palumbo, S. A., et al. (January 1976). "Microbiology and Technology of the Pepperoni Process" (abstract). Journal of Food Science. Volume 41, Issue 1. pages 12–17. 
 Palumbo, S. A. et al. (July 1977). "Kinetics of Pepperoni Drying" (abstract). Journal of Food Science. Volume 42, Issue 4. pages 1029–1033.

External links
 

American sausages
Lunch meat
Fermented sausages
Italian words and phrases
Sliced foods
Toppings